Marco Antonio Gutiérrez Romero (born 30 August 1955) is a Mexican politician affiliated with the Institutional Revolutionary Party. As of 2014 he served as Deputy of the LIX Legislature of the Mexican Congress representing the State of Mexico.

References

1955 births
Living people
Politicians from Hidalgo (state)
Institutional Revolutionary Party politicians
Deputies of the LIX Legislature of Mexico
Members of the Chamber of Deputies (Mexico) for the State of Mexico